Alfred Soultan (born 1976) is a Hungarian playwright, screenwriter, poet, and critic  currently living in the United States.

Theatrical Works
Alone, Amongst Thousands ("Magamban, ezerek között") - poems
The Griffin-Licence ("A griff-licenc") - satire in two acts based on the short novel of Jozsef Koves
The Doll ("A baba") - tragedy in two acts
Animal World ("Állatvilág") - play; obscene pathos for the 20th century
Dawning Aurora ("Derengő Hajnal") stage play in two acts based on Amongst Humans by István Fekete
Marionette Short Story ("Marionett novella") tragicomedy based on the works of Jozsef Koves

Movie Productions
The Violin (executive producer)
Oy Vey! My Son Is Gay! (executive producer, creative consultant)
Father Fabulous (director, producer, writer)
Music video for Live the Dream by Lori Carpenter (executive producer) 
 The Bondage (executive producer, story consultant, editor)

Novels and screenplays
He currently has a 7 figure deal for developing original screenplays for independent features, animated features, and high budget feature movies.

Camp Tales ("Tábori történetek") - thematic collection of short stories
Bluechkin ("Szomoronc") - a tale
It Was Not Easy to Get You ("Nem volt könnyű megszereznem téged") - a novel
Heavenly Voices ("Mennyei hangok") - screenplay; a comedy
The Hermit ("A remete") - opera libretto
Scott ("Scott") - novel, then screenplay trilogy
CASFAP ("MESZOVE") - tragicomedy in two parts
Spade, Hoe, Hammer ("Ásó, kapa, kalapács") - a novel
She is a Conversationalist ("A társalkodónő") - a novel
One Week Beats Eternity ("Egy hét a világ") - a novel
Vesperal Loneliness ("Esteli magány") - poems
Sherman Valentine ("Sherman Valentine") - a novel
Tropical Fish House ("Trópusi díszhal ház") - a novel
The Snow Queen ("A hókirálynő") - screenplay for animated feature
Letter Novel ("Levélregény") - novel and screenplay
The Three Musketeers ("A három testőr") - screenplay

Awards
First Prize - National Literary Competition - Hajdúböszörmény, June 11, 1993
First Prize - Literary Competition - Debrecen, November 22, 1993

Sources
City Library of Tiszafüred 
1997 Blog Entry
1997 Blog Entry quoting his poem on celibacy
Hungarian National Theatre

1976 births
Living people
Hungarian male dramatists and playwrights
20th-century Hungarian dramatists and playwrights
21st-century Hungarian dramatists and playwrights